"The Rivers of Belief" is a 1991 song created by the musical project, Enigma. The single was the last to be released from MCMXC a.D..

On the album, the song is part three of the overarching song, "Back to the Rivers of Belief", which includes the songs "Way to Eternity" and "Hallelujah", which then segues into "Rivers of Belief". The single version of the song starts with a sample of the intro to Bach's Toccata & Fugue in D minor and a spoken passage by Sandra, before picking up where the album version begins.

Track listing
 "The Rivers of Belief" (Radio Edit) – 4:24
 "The Rivers of Belief" (Extended Version) – 7:49
 "Knocking on Forbidden Doors" – 3:46

Charts
Australia #160
Sweden #37
UK #68

References

Enigma (German band) songs
1991 singles
Songs written by Michael Cretu
1991 songs
Virgin Records singles
Song recordings produced by Michael Cretu
Music videos directed by Howard Greenhalgh